Monroe Township is a township in Linn County, Iowa.

History
Monroe Township was organized in 1849.

References

Townships in Linn County, Iowa
Townships in Iowa
1849 establishments in Iowa
Populated places established in 1849